Moores Corner is an unincorporated community in Kent County, Delaware, United States. Moores Corner is located at the intersection of Delaware Route 15 and Pearsons Corner Road, west of Cheswold.

References

Unincorporated communities in Kent County, Delaware
Unincorporated communities in Delaware